The United States under secretary of defense for policy (USDP) is a high level civilian official in the United States Department of Defense. The under secretary of defense for policy is the principal staff assistant and adviser to both the secretary of defense and the deputy secretary of defense for all matters concerning the formation of national security and defense policy.

The under secretary is normally appointed from civilian life by the president with the advice and consent of the Senate. The incumbent under secretary is Colin Kahl, who was confirmed by the Senate on 27 April 2021, and sworn in the following day.

Overview

The Office of the Under Secretary of Defense for Policy is the principal staff element of the secretary of defense in the exercise of policy development, planning, resource management, fiscal, and program evaluation responsibilities, the rank of Under Secretary, the USD(P) is a Level III position within the Executive Schedule.

Reporting officials
Officials reporting to the USD(P) include:
 Principal deputy under secretary of defense for policy

Strategy, Plans, & Capabilities 
The assistant secretary of defense for strategy, plans, and capabilities (ASD(SPC)) is responsible for national security and defense strategy, leading the National Defense Strategy, nuclear deterrence and missile defense policy, security cooperation plans and policies, and force design and development planning.

Mission:
Support the Secretary and Deputy Secretary of Defense and the Under Secretary of Defense for Policy in providing the Department of Defense (DoD) with guidance to align resources, activities and capabilities with National Security and Defense Strategy goals.
Provide DoD input to the National Security Strategy and associated national, regional and functional strategies.
Develop National Defense Strategy (NDS), Guidance for Development of the Force (GDF) and Guidance for Employment of the Force (GEF)
Review campaign and contingency plans, major force deployments and military operational plans
Evaluate the capability of forces to accomplish U.S. Defense and National Security Strategy.
Develop policy and strategy guidance to enhance partner capabilities and compatibility with DoD.
Develop Global Force Posture policy and strategy and oversee implementation
Lead the Quadrennial Defense Review

International Security Affairs 
The assistant secretary of defense for international security affairs (ASD(ISA)) is responsible for international security strategy, defense policy, and oversight of security cooperation programs and foreign military sales programs relating to Europe, the North Atlantic Treaty Organization, Russia, Eurasia, the Middle East, Africa, and the Western Hemisphere.
 The deputy assistant secretary of defense for African affairs provides advice on international security strategy, defense policy, and oversight of security cooperation programs relating to Sub-Sahara Africa. 
 The deputy assistant secretary of defense for the Middle East provides advice on international security strategy, defense policy, and oversight of security cooperation programs relating to the Middle East and North Africa.
 The deputy assistant secretary of defense for Europe and NATO provides advice on international security strategy, defense policy, and oversight of security cooperation programs relating to Europe and NATO.
 The deputy assistant secretary of defense for Russia, Ukraine, and Eurasia provides advice on international security strategy, defense policy, and oversight of security cooperation programs relating to conventional arms control, Russia, Ukraine, Western Balkans, and Eurasian nations. 
 The secretary of defense representative in the United States Mission to NATO.
 The secretary of defense representative to the Organization for Security and Co-operation in Europe.

Homeland Defense & Global Security 
The assistant secretary of defense for homeland defense and the assistant secretary of defense for global strategic affairs (AD(HDGS)) are responsible for the policy, strategy, and implementation guidance for national and global security issues across countering weapons of mass destruction, cyber operations, homeland defense activities, antiterrorism, continuity of government and mission assurance, defense support to civil authorities, and space-related matters. The AD(HDGS) is also responsible for the Protected Critical Infrastructure Program (PCII), the Domestic Preparedness Support Initiative, and the Defense Critical Infrastructure Program (DCIP).
 The deputy assistant secretary of defense for cyber policy  is responsible for the development and implementation of cyber policies, strategies, and plans to guide the United States Department of Defense including the United States Cyber Command. 
 The deputy assistant secretary of defense for space policy is responsible for the policy and guidance of space policy and space-related issues including international space cooperation of the United States Department of Defense.
 The deputy assistant secretary of defense for countering weapons of mass destruction is responsible for the policy and guidance for chemical, biological, radiological, and nuclear protection, weapons of mass destruction countermeasures, and counterproliferation and non-proliferation.
 The deputy assistant secretary of defense for homeland defense integration and defense support of civil authorities is responsible for the development, coordination, and oversight of the integration and implementation of plans and policy for defense support of civil authorities and civil-military co-operation.
 The deputy assistant secretary of defense for defense continuity and mission assurance is responsible for the development of policies and plans for continuity of government, mission assurance, counterterrorism, emergency management, and critical infrastructure protection.

Special Operations & Low Intensity Conflict 
The assistant secretary of defense for special operations/low-intensity conflict (ASD(SO/LIC)) is responsible for the policy, resources, strategic capabilities and force transformation, and oversight of special operations and low-intensity conflict matters of the United States Department of Defense across counterterrorism, unconventional warfare, direct action, special reconnaissance, foreign internal defense, civil affairs, information and psychological operations, and counterproliferation of weapons of mass destruction.
 The deputy assistant secretary of defense for counternarcotics and global threats is responsible for the policy, resources, strategic capabilities and force transformation, and oversight of special capabilities for counternarcotics and global threats.
 The deputy assistant secretary of defense for stability and humanitarian affairs is responsible for the policy, resources, strategic capabilities and force transformation, and oversight of conflict stabilization activities, peace operations, and humanitarian relief efforts.
 The deputy assistant secretary of defense for special operations and combatting terrorism is responsible for the policy, resources, strategic capabilities and force transformation, and oversight of counterterrorism, counterinsurgency, foreign internal defense, and psychological operations as well as providing staff oversight of the United States Special Operations Command resources, budget, and program development issues.

Indo-Pacific Security Affairs 
The assistant secretary of defense for Indo-Pacific security affairs (ASD(IPSA)) is responsible for international security strategy, defense policy, and oversight of security cooperation programs relating to the Asia-Pacific region. 
 The deputy assistant secretary of defense for East Asia provides advice on international security strategy, defense policy, and oversight of security cooperation programs relating to Taiwan, Hong Kong, Mongolia, Japan, South Korea, and North Korea.
 The deputy assistant secretary of defense for China provides advice on international security strategy, defense policy, and bilateral security relations relating to China.
 The deputy assistant secretary of defense for South and Southeast Asia provides advice on international security strategy, defense policy, and oversight of security cooperation programs relating to India, Bangladesh, Bhutan, Diego Garcia (in conjunction with ASD(ISA)), Maldives, Nepal, Sri Lanka, Brunei, Burma, Cambodia, East Timor, Indonesia, Laos, Malaysia, Philippines, Singapore, Thailand, Vietnam, Australia, New Zealand, Papua New Guinea, and the Pacific Islands nations.
 The deputy assistant secretary of defense for Afghanistan, Pakistan, and Central Asia provides advice on international security strategy, defense policy, and oversight of security cooperation programs relating to Afghanistan, Pakistan, Kazakhstan, Kyrgyzstan, Tajikistan, Turkmenistan, and Uzbekistan.

Space Policy 
The assistant secretary of defense for space policy (ASD(SP)) is responsible for the overall supervision of DoD policy for space warfighting.

Defense POW/MIA Accounting Agency 
The director of the Defense POW/MIA Accounting Agency is responsible for the personnel recovery of United States Department of Defense personnel who are listed as prisoners of war (POW) or missing in action (MIA), from all past wars and conflicts around the world.

Defense Security Cooperation Agency 
The director of the Defense Security Cooperation Agency is responsible for providing allies and partner nations with financial and technical assistance, transfer of defense matériel, training, and the promotion of military-to-military contacts.

Defense Technology Security Administration 
The director of the Defense Technology Security Administration is responsible for the formulation and enforcement of technology security policies related to international transfers of defense-related goods, services, and technologies.

Budget

Budget features
Defense Critical Infrastructure Program (DCIP): Oversees policy formulation and strategic planning for the Defense Critical Infrastructure Program, to include the Defense Industrial Base, which provides defense-related products and services that are essential to equip; mobilize; deploy and sustain military operations, enabling the Warfighter to minimize risk. Ensures the resiliency of networked infrastructure assets, whether owned or operated by the DoD or private industry, that are critical to executing military missions. Activities include the identification, assessment, monitoring, and risk management of cyber and physical infrastructure assets critical to the execution of the National Military Strategy. DCIP is run under the auspices of the Office of the Assistant Secretary of Defense for Homeland Defense and Americas' Security Affairs, where it is overseen by the DASD, Homeland Defense Strategy and Force Planning.
Global Threat Management: Provides policy, guidance and oversight on existential threats, supranational threats and non-state actor threats. OUSD(P) fulfills this global mission by crafting and implementing initiatives to expand cultural understanding throughout the world in governed and ungoverned areas to aid in preventing the expansion of terrorist cells. Utilizes table top exercises to enable Members of Congress, Administration Officials, and DoD personnel to form strategies in addressing catastrophic security events. Active research and involvement in the ever-changing cyber environment to protect security assets and prevent sophisticated threats in cyberspace from adversaries domestic and foreign. This funding appears to primarily support the programs of the Office of the Assistant Secretary of Defense for Global Strategic Affairs.
Homeland Defense Support Activities: Formulates policy and conducts DoD strategic planning for homeland defense and defense support of civil authorities, including installation preparedness; CBRNE preparedness and consequence management; border security and National Security Special Events. Supports the U.S. Northern Command in homeland defense strategy, and enhances the U.S. Southern Command mission through engagement with the ministries of defense of Western Hemisphere nations. It supervises intradepartmental and inter-agency coordination of the above issues. Conducts oversight of DoD processes to exercise force readiness through the National Exercise Program. Manages defense continuity and conducts crisis management. This funding appears to primarily support the programs of the Office of the Assistant Secretary of Defense for Homeland Defense and Americas' Security Affairs.
Policy Planning and Integration: OUSD(P) coordinates activities to aid in formulating strategies for DoD programs at national and international levels. This involves establishing and monitoring strategic direction, planning and force development as laid out in reporting documents such as the Quadrennial Defense Review (QDR) and Defense Planning and Programming Guidance (DPPG). OUSD(P) ensures decisions are not made in a vacuum by integrating policies and resources related to humanitarian efforts and their compliance with international laws. Initiates crisis decision-making in an interagency setting; creates forums to explore emerging national security issues; and examines the capabilities and limitations of national power through various instruments. Funding allows interagency integration and coordination to determine requirements for potential dual-use application of Defense assets.
Regional Security Affairs: Provides analysis of management of cultural situations in nation states and oversight to military joint ventures and cooperative DoD-Foreign government programs including educational, training, and developmental opportunities. Using a variety of resources, maintains regional expertise to support DoD leadership in forming and implementing strategies and contributes to coordinating holistic government engagement in programs and policies. Regional expertise provides the ability to: monitor and solve security cooperation issues, effectively execute coalition management, monitor international security operations, and further develop cooperative relations with foreign countries. This funding appears to primarily support the programs of the Office of the Assistant Secretary of Defense for Asian and Pacific Security Affairs and Office of the Assistant Secretary of Defense for International Security Affairs
Rewards Program: Provides funds to publicize the program and pay rewards for information to disrupt international terrorist activities.
Travel: This funding supports travel in support of the OUSD(P) mission.
US Mission to NATO: Funding provides regional stability interface with US allies, NATO resolution of regional conflicts, response to terrorism and unstable conditions in fragile and failed nation states that include NATO involvement, weapons of mass destruction bilateral measures, and support of overseas facilities.
Warfighting Support Activities: OUSD(P) provides resources to orchestrate the development of special technologies and capabilities. It sustains these efforts by conducting in-depth analyses of the assignment of additional military and civilian personnel to long-term, non-intelligence positions in high-priority countries. Prepares the military for confronting threats in culturally diverse countries, supports policies and strategies that develop skills unique to counterinsurgency and stabilization efforts; reinforces and builds international support over shared security concerns, homeland security, counterterrorism and other critical nation alliances, and promotes humanitarian activities through military resources in a non-combative manner. Provides funds to pay rewards for information to disrupt international terrorist activities and enhance US security capabilities. This funding appears to primarily support the programs of the Office of the Assistant Secretary of Defense for Special Operations/Low Intensity Conflict & Interdependent Capabilities

List of under secretaries of defense for policy

Principal Deputy
The Principal Deputy Under Secretary of Defense for Policy is the chief staff assistant to the USD(P). Originally established as the Deputy Under Secretary of Defense (Policy) by the National Defense Authorization Act for FY 1992–93 (P.L. 102–190), the post was re-designated Principal Deputy Under Secretary of Defense (Policy), or PDUSD(P) in December 1999 by DoD Directive 5111.3. The PDUSD(P) provides advice and assistance to the Secretary of Defense, Deputy Secretary of Defense, and USD(P) on national security policy, military strategy, and defense policy.

Notes and references